The Therapeutic Goods Act 1989 is an Act of the Commonwealth of Australia which regulates therapeutic goods. The Act is administered by the Therapeutic Goods Administration (TGA), which is part of the Commonwealth Department of Health. The statutory framework set out in the Act is supplemented by the Therapeutic Goods Regulations 1990 and the Therapeutic Goods (Medical Devices) Regulations 2002. 

The central mechanism through which therapeutic goods (being medicines, biologicals and medical devices) are regulated is the Australian Register of Therapeutic Goods (ARTG). Subject to the alternative supply/export pathways set out in the Act, all therapeutic goods must be "registered" (for prescription medicines), "listed" (for complementary and over-the-counter medicines) or "included" (for biologicals and medical devices) in the ARTG to be lawfully supplied in Australia.

History
In 2020, the TGA re-classified nicotine as a Schedule 4 substance under the Poisons Standard, meaning that consumers require a prescription from a medical prescription to obtain a nicotine a vaping product. To date, there are no nicotine vaping products registered or included on the ARTG, so consumers must obtain these through the Authorised Prescriber (AP) Scheme, Special Access Scheme (SAS) B or Personal Importation Scheme pathways.

References

1989 in Australia
Health law in Australia
Health policy in Australia
Law of Australia
Medical regulation in Australia
Pharmaceuticals policy
Medical law